Costa Rica competed at the 2011 Pan American Games in Guadalajara, Mexico from October 14 to 30, 2011. Costa Rica sent 91 athletes in 18 sports.

Medalists

Athletics

Men

Track and road events

Field events

Women

Track and road events

Basque pelota

Men

Beach volleyball

Costa Rica qualified a men's and women's team in the beach volleyball competition.

Bowling

Costa Rica qualified two male and two female athletes in the individual and team bowling competitions.

Men

Individual

Pairs

Women

Individual

Pairs

Boxing

Costa Rica qualified one athlete in the 49 kg men's category, and one athlete in the 51 kg women's category

Men

Women

Cycling

Costa Rica qualified a cycling team.

Road

Men

Women

Track

Omnium

Mountain biking

Men

Women

Equestrian

Dressage

Fencing

Costa Rica qualified one athlete in the individual women's épée competition.

Women

Football

Costa Rica qualified a men's and women's team in the football competition.

Men

Squad

Vianney Blanco
Kevin Briceno
Keyner Brown
Jorge Davis
Rudy Dawson
Johnson Derrick
Dylan Flores
Jonathan McDonald
Gualberto Montenegro
Joseph Mora
Carlos Ochoa
Ricardo Rojas
Jean Sanchez
Jordan Smith
Bryan Vega
Deyver Vega
Carlos Viales
Oscar Villalovos

Standings

Results
 

Semifinals

Bronze medal match 

Women

Squad

Wendy Acosta
Katherine Alvarado
Julieth Arias
Yirlania Arroyo
Mariela Campos
Daniela Cruz
Shirley Cruz
Karolina Durán
María Gamboa
Hazel Quirós
Lixy Rodríguez
Raquel Rodríguez
Saudy Rosales
Diana Sáenz
Carol Sánchez
Marianne Ugalde
Carolina Venegas
Yendry Villalobos

Standings

Results

Gymnastics

Artistic
Costa Rica qualified one male and one female athlete in the artistic gymnastics competition.

Men

Individual qualification & Team Finals

Women
Individual qualification & Team Finals

Karate

Costa Rica qualified one athlete in the 68 kg women's category.

Racquetball

Costa Rica qualified two male athletes in the racquetball competition.

Men

Roller skating

Costa Rica qualified a women's team in the roller skating competition.

Women

Rowing

Women

Swimming

Men

Women

Synchronized swimming

Costa Rica qualified a duet in the synchronized swimming competition.

Taekwondo

Costa Rica qualified two athletes in the 58 kg and 80+kg men's categories and one athlete in the 67 kg women's category.

Men

Women

Triathlon

Men

Women

Weightlifting

References

Nations at the 2011 Pan American Games
P
2011